Gerald F. Schroeder (born September 13, 1939) is a former American attorney and jurist who served as chief justice of Idaho. He was appointed to the court in 1995 by Governor Phil Batt, and was elected chief justice by his peers in 2004. He served on the court for over a dozen years and retired in July 2007.

Early life and education 
Born in Boise, Idaho, Schroeder attended public schools in Caldwell, Idaho and Baker, Oregon, where he was salutatorian at Baker High School in 1957. He earned a Bachelor of Arts in History from the College of Idaho in Caldwellin 1961, and initially planned on becoming a history professor. He took the Law School Admission Test (LSAT) on a whim and was accepted to Harvard Law School, earning his J.D. in 1964.

Career 
After graduating from law school, Schroeder returned to Idaho and worked for several firms in Boise for three years. He was then appointed a deputy U.S. attorney  became a county probate judge in 1969, and a magistrate two years later. He became a state judge in 1975 in the fourth district (Boise), a position he held for two decades, until his appointment to the state supreme court in  Schroeder retained his seat in 1996 and 2002, running unopposed in both 

As a district judge, Schroeder made headlines in 1987 as he ruled that the state lottery initiative, approved by voters the previous November, was unconstitutional. His decision was upheld 4-1 by the state supreme court, and resulted in an amendment to the state constitution. Voters approved that in November 1988, and the lottery was launched in July 1989.

Schroeder ordered the execution of double-murderer Keith Wells in 1992. Carried out in January 1994, it was Idaho's first execution in over 36 years and the tenth in state history. He was among the officials that witnessed the execution by lethal injection at the Idaho State Correctional Institution.

References

Justices of the Idaho Supreme Court
Harvard Law School alumni
College of Idaho alumni
People from Boise, Idaho
1939 births
Living people
Chief Justices of the Idaho Supreme Court